John Trelawny may refer to:

John Trelawny I (fl. 1397), MP for Bodmin (UK Parliament constituency) in 1397, father of John Trelawny II
John Trelawny II (fl. 1413–1421), MP for Cornwall (UK Parliament constituency) 1413–1421, son of John Trelawny I
John Trelawny III (fl. 1421–1449), MP for Liskeard (UK Parliament constituency) 1421 and Lostwithiel (UK Parliament constituency) 1449
 John Trelawny (died 1563), Member of Parliament (MP) for Liskeard
 John Trelawny (died 1568), his son, High Sheriff of Cornwall
 Sir John Trelawny, 1st Baronet (1592–1664), Royalist before and during the English Civil War
 John Trelawny (died 1680), MP for West Looe
 John Trelawny (died 1682), MP for West Looe (UK Parliament constituency)
 John Trelawny (1633–1706), MP for Plymouth (UK Parliament constituency)
 Sir John Trelawny, 4th Baronet (1691–1756), MP for East Looe, West Looe and Liskeard
 Sir John Salusbury-Trelawny, 9th Baronet (1816–1885), MP for Tavistock and Eastern Cornwall

See also
Squire John Trelawney